Ledgelawn Cemetery is a historic cemetery in Bar Harbor, Maine, United States. Established in 1903, several prominent early business owners, notable summer residents, and other townspeople are buried in the cemetery.

The need for a new cemetery was reported in the Bar Harbor Record on February 24, 1887:

Notable burials 

Listed chronologically:

 Frederick Lincoln Savage (1861–1924), architect
 William Henry Sherman (1865–1928), businessman and author
 Walter Damrosch (1862–1950), composer and conductor
 George G. McMurtry (1876–1958), Medal of Honor recipient
 Genevieve Fox (1888–1959), author

References

External links 

 Partial plan of Ledgelawn Cemtery, drawn in 1903 - Mount Desert Historical Society

 Ledgelawn Cemetery – Find a Grave

Buildings and structures in Bar Harbor, Maine
Cemeteries in Maine
1903 establishments in Maine